Deyver Vega (born 19 September 1992) is a Costa Rican professional footballer who plays for the Costa Rica national football team as a forward.

Club career
Vega signed for Tippeligaen side SK Brann on 2 March 2016, on a contract until the summer of 2019.

International career
At the youth level he played in both the 2009 FIFA U-17 World Cup and the 2011 FIFA U-20 World Cup.

Vega was called up to the Costa Rica senior team for the 2015 CONCACAF Gold Cup and played in Costa Rica's opening game.

Career statistics

Club

International

Honours

Club
Deportivo Saprissa
Liga FPD: Clausura 2014, Apertura 2014, Apertura 2015
Costa Rican Cup: 2013

References

External links
 

1992 births
Living people
People from San Carlos (canton)
Association football forwards
Costa Rican footballers
Costa Rican expatriate footballers
Costa Rica international footballers
2015 CONCACAF Gold Cup players
2017 Copa Centroamericana players
Deportivo Saprissa players
SK Brann players
Vålerenga Fotball players
Sandefjord Fotball players
FC Politehnica Iași (2010) players
Liga FPD players
Eliteserien players
Liga I players
Costa Rican expatriate sportspeople in Norway
Expatriate footballers in Norway
Expatriate footballers in Romania
Costa Rican expatriate sportspeople in Romania
Costa Rica youth international footballers
Costa Rica under-20 international footballers